Jiří Mašek (born 5 October 1978 in Czechoslovakia) is a Czech football player. He plays as a striker for USV Oed/Zeillern in Austria.

Mašek played before for Jablonec 97 and Teplice. He also played for Malatyaspor in 2005-06 season in Turkey.

References

External links 
 

1978 births
Living people
Czech footballers
FK Jablonec players
FK Teplice players
MKE Ankaragücü footballers
Nea Salamis Famagusta FC players
Malatyaspor footballers
MFK Ružomberok players
FC Wacker Innsbruck (2002) players
APOP Kinyras FC players
FK Viktoria Žižkov players
1. FC Lokomotive Leipzig players
Slovak Super Liga players
Süper Lig players
Czech First League players
Austrian Football Bundesliga players
Cypriot First Division players
Czech expatriate footballers
Expatriate footballers in Turkey
Czech expatriate sportspeople in Turkey
Expatriate footballers in Slovakia
Czech expatriate sportspeople in Slovakia
Expatriate footballers in Cyprus
Czech expatriate sportspeople in Cyprus
Expatriate footballers in Austria
Czech expatriate sportspeople in Austria
Expatriate footballers in Germany
Czech expatriate sportspeople in Germany
Sportspeople from Mladá Boleslav
Association football forwards